John Allen Collier (November 13, 1787 in Litchfield, Litchfield County, Connecticut – March 24, 1873 in Binghamton, Broome County, New York) was an American lawyer and politician.

Life
He attended Yale College in 1803, then studied law at Litchfield Law School. He was admitted to the bar at Troy, New York in 1809, and commenced practice in Binghamton, New York. He was District Attorney of Broome County from 1818 to 1822.

He was elected as an Anti-Mason to the 22nd United States Congress, serving from March 4, 1831 to March 3, 1833. He was defeated for re-election.

He was New York State Comptroller from January 27, 1841, to February 7, 1842, elected by the New York State Legislature to fill the unexpired term of Bates Cooke. Then, he resumed the practice of law.

He was an unsuccessful candidate for election in 1844 to the U.S. Congress. He was appointed a commissioner to revise the state statutes in 1847. He was a presidential elector on the Whig ticket in 1848.

He was buried at the Spring Forest Cemetery, Binghamton.

A street in Binghamton is named in his honor.

He is the great-grandfather of United States Representative Edwin Arthur Hall.

Sources

His obit, in NYT on March 25, 1873 (giving wrong years for end of Congress term, and comptrollership) (PDF)
Google Books The New York Civil List compiled by Franklin Benjamin Hough (Weed, Parsons and Co., 1858)
John A. Collier on Political Graveyard
Holt, Michael P., "The Rise and Fall of the American Whig Party", Oxford University Press, 1999, pg. 651.

External links

1787 births
1873 deaths
Politicians from Litchfield, Connecticut
Anti-Masonic Party members of the United States House of Representatives from New York (state)
New York (state) Whigs
New York State Comptrollers
Politicians from Binghamton, New York
19th-century American politicians
Lawyers from Binghamton, New York
Litchfield Law School alumni
Yale College alumni
19th-century American lawyers